Harijs Vītoliņš (Harijs Vitolinsh; born April 30, 1968) is a Latvian former professional ice hockey centre.  After being selected twice in the NHL Entry Draft, Vītoliņš played eight games in the National Hockey League with the Winnipeg Jets during the 1993–94 season, going scoreless.

Vītoliņš was promoted to head coach of Dynamo Moscow after Oleg Znaroks was named as Zinetula Bilyaletdinov's successor as Russia's head coach. Vītoliņš also served as an assistant to Znaroks. In May 2014, the Russian national team coached by Znaroks and Vītoliņš won the world ice hockey championship in Minsk, Belarus.

Career statistics

Regular season and playoffs

International

References

External links

 
 
 
 

1968 births
Living people
Dinamo Riga players
ECH Chur players
HC Ambrì-Piotta players
HC Thurgau players
Ice hockey players at the 2002 Winter Olympics
Latvian ice hockey coaches
Latvian ice hockey centres
Latvian expatriate sportspeople in Russia
Moncton Hawks players
Montreal Canadiens draft picks
New Haven Senators players
Olympic ice hockey players of Latvia
Russia men's national ice hockey team coaches
SC Rapperswil-Jona Lakers players
Rögle BK players
SC Langnau players
Soviet ice hockey centres
Ice hockey people from Riga
Thunder Bay Thunder Hawks players
Winnipeg Jets (1979–1996) draft picks
Winnipeg Jets (1979–1996) players
Latvian expatriate sportspeople in Canada
Latvian expatriate sportspeople in the United States
Latvian expatriate sportspeople in Switzerland
Latvian expatriate sportspeople in Sweden
Expatriate ice hockey players in the United States
Expatriate ice hockey players in Canada
Expatriate ice hockey players in Switzerland
Expatriate ice hockey players in Sweden
Latvia men's national ice hockey team coaches
Ice hockey coaches at the 2022 Winter Olympics
Latvian expatriate ice hockey people